Tara is the third and last studio album of the original member  Filipino rock band, Yano. It has 11 tracks and also its first album for major label BMG Records (Pilipinas), Inc. having moved from local independent, Alpha Records.

Track listing
All tracks by Dong Abay and Eric Gancio, except where noted.

"Ako"  Eric Gancio – 04:48
"Paalam Sampaguita"  – 03:39
"Tara"  – 04:46
"Kaklase"  – 04:45
"Abno"  – 04:36
"Mercy" – 04:27
"Going Home" – 04:30
"Me Mama"  Dong Abay, Eric Gancio and Onie Badiang – 04:37
"Shobis"  – 02:01
"War" Eric Gancio – 03:49)
"Isa"  – 02:35

Personnel
Dong Abay – 
Eric Gancio – 
Onie Badiang – 
Jun Nogoy – 
Nowie Favila –

References

External links
http://www.peyups.com/dekada90/yano.khtml (written in Tagalog)
https://web.archive.org/web/20120307232546/http://www.titikpilipino.com/songs/songinfo.php?songid=16470

1997 albums
Yano albums